Chuj might refer to:
 A component of Russian and Polish profanity
 Chuj language, a Mayan language spoken in western Guatemala and southern Mexico
 Chuj people, speakers of the Chuj language
 Chuj, Iran, a village in Hormozgan Province, Iran
Chuj (bathhouse), a traditional steam bath used in Guatemala

See also
 Chuj climbing salamander Dendrotriton chujorum

Polish profanity